A chungah is an obsolete unit of volume used in India, approximately equal to 1/6 of an imperial gallon (0.758 litres). After metrication in the mid-20th century the unit became obsolete.

See also
List of customary units of measurement in South Asia

References

Units of volume
Customary units in India
Obsolete units of measurement